The 2015 Copa Constitució was the 23rd season of Andorra's national football knockout tournament. The competition began on 21 February 2015 with the matches of the first elimination round and ended on 10 May 2015 with the final. UE Sant Julià, the defending champions, won the tournament. The team earned a place in the first qualifying round of the 2015–16 UEFA Europa League.

A total of sixteen teams competed in the tournament.

Results

First round
Sixteen teams entered this round, eight from 2014–15 Primera Divisió and eight from 2014–15 Segona Divisió. The matches were played on 21, 22 February and 1 March 2015.

|}

Replay
The match was played on 5 March 2015.

|}

Quarterfinals
The matches were played on 1, 3, 4 and 8 March 2015.

|}

Semifinals
The matches were played on 8 and 11 March 2015.

|}

Final

References

External links
Results at soccerway.com

Copa Constitució seasons
Andorra
Copa